Lewis Worrell (born November 7, 1934) is a jazz double bassist best known for his work during the 1960s with Albert Ayler, the New York Art Quartet, Roswell Rudd, and Archie Shepp.

Biography
Worrell was born in Charlotte, North Carolina, and began playing the tuba at age 11, switching to double bass six years later. In 1953 he graduated from Second Ward High School in Brooklyn (Charlotte, North Carolina), after which he served in the United States Military in France. He was a member of John Lewis' Orchestra USA and played with Bud Powell and Elmo Hope. Worrell's first recording was in 1963, on Hank Crawford's album True Blue.

In 1964, Worrell joined the New York Art Quartet, replacing Don Moore, and participated in the recording of their first, self-titled album. He also performed with the NYAQ as part of the October Revolution in Jazz. The following year, he recorded with Albert Ayler on the live album Bells, and with Sunny Murray on his album Sonny's Time Now. In 1966, he appeared on Ayler's At Slug's Saloon, Vol. 1 & 2 and also recorded two albums with Archie Shepp (Live in San Francisco and Three for a Quarter, One for a Dime, both released on Impulse!), as well as on Roswell Rudd's album Everywhere. Worrell made a handful of recordings in the late 1960s and early 1970s, then disappeared from the music scene.

Discography

As sideman
With Albert Ayler
 Bells (ESP-Disk, 1965)
 The New Wave in Jazz (Impulse!, 1966) (one track)
 At Slug's Saloon, Vol. 1 (Base Record, 1982)
 At Slug's Saloon, Vol. 2 (Base Record, 1982)

With Hank Crawford
 True Blue (Atlantic, 1964)

With Robin Kenyatta
 Until (Vortex, 1967)
 Stompin' at the Savoy (Atlantic, 1974)

With Sunny Murray
 Sonny's Time Now (Jihad, 1965)

With the New York Art Quartet
 New York Art Quartet (ESP-Disk, 1964)
 Call It Art (Triple Point, 2013)

With Sam Rivers
 Live (Impulse!, 1998)

With Roswell Rudd
 Everywhere (Impulse!, 1966) (tracks reissued on Mixed (Impulse!, 1998)
 Blown Bone (Emanem, 2006)

With Archie Shepp
 Live in San Francisco (Impulse!, 1966)
 Three for a Quarter, One for a Dime (Impulse!, 1966)

References 

American jazz double-bassists
Free jazz double-bassists
Musicians from Charlotte, North Carolina
1934 births
Living people